Code 404 is a British police procedural comedy-drama television series created by Tom Miller, Sam Myer and Daniel Peak, and produced by Kudos. The first series premiered on 29 April 2020 on Sky One, before later moving to Sky Comedy, where the second series premiered on 1 September 2021, also broadcasting simultaneously on Sky Showcase. It stars Stephen Graham and Daniel Mays and co-stars Anna Maxwell Martin, Rosie Cavaliero and Tracy Ann Oberman.

Plot
Set in the near future, Code 404 revolves around a pair of top-notch investigators, DI John Major (Daniel Mays) and DI Roy Carver (Stephen Graham). When Major is killed on duty, his body is transferred to an experimental artificial intelligence project to revive him. However, the AI lacks the crimefighting instincts of Major. 

As of 2022, all 3 series have aired. The third series premiered on August 4, 2022.

Cast
 Stephen Graham as DI Roy Carver
 Daniel Mays as DI John Major 
 Rosie Cavaliero as DCS Dennett
 Anna Maxwell Martin as Dr. Kelly Major 
 Amanda Payton as Dr. Alison Parfit
 Michelle Greenidge as PC/DS Judith Papastathopoulos
 Richard Gadd as Liam Cleasby
 Tracy-Ann Oberman as Helen Chalmers
 Steve Oram as DI Simon Gilbert (Series 1—2)
 Emily Lloyd-Saini as DI Jeanette Ryle (Series 1—2)
 Steve Meo as DI Paul Stokes (Series 2)
 Michael Armstrong as PC Michael Michaels (Series 2―3)
 Clive Russell as Clifford Major (Series 2)
 Vinette Robinson as Prof. Sarah McAllister (Series 3)

Episodes

Series 1 (2020)

Series 2 (2021)

Series 3 (2022)

Reception
The series has had generally positive reviews and has achieved a score of 80% on Rotten Tomatoes.

References

External links

2020 British television series debuts
Sky UK original programming
Television series by Banijay
English-language television shows
Television shows set in England
2020s British comedy-drama television series
2020s British crime television series